Alicia Prieto Langarica is an American applied mathematician and professor of mathematics at Youngstown State University.

Education and career
Prieto Langarica is the granddaughter of Mexican footballer Max Prieto. She is a graduate of the University of Texas at Dallas, and received her PhD in Applied Mathematics from University of Texas at Arlington in 2012. Her dissertation, From Discrete to Continuous Models of Cell Movement: An Application to Medical Implants was completed under the guidance of Hristo Venelinov Kojouharov.

She became an assistant professor of mathematics at Youngstown State University faculty in 2012, after she finished her doctorate.

Contributions
Prieto Langarica's research focuses on the intersection of mathematics and biology, specifically problems related to the medical field.

She is one of four co-founders of Lathisms, a website that showcase Hispanic and Latinx mathematicians, their research, and their contributions.

In 2019 she became one of the associate directors of Project NExT, a program of the Mathematical Association of America to mentor new doctorates in mathematics.

During the COVID-19 pandemic, she organized events to give students food during shutdown, focusing particularly on the needs of international students stuck in university housing.

Awards and honors
Langarica won the Henry L. Alder Award for Distinguished Teaching from the Mathematical Association of America in 2019. She also won the 25 Under 35 Award in 2017, and was nominated for the Athena Award in 2019. She competed for five years in the Mexican Mathematical Olympiad, with first place finishes in two years.

References

External links 

 
Math genealogy entry for Langarica

Year of birth missing (living people)
Living people
21st-century American mathematicians
American women mathematicians
University of Texas at Arlington alumni
University of Texas at Dallas alumni
Youngstown State University faculty
21st-century American women